Carlos Noriega (19 June 1922 – September 1991) was a Uruguayan swimmer. He competed in the men's 100 metre backstroke at the 1948 Summer Olympics.

References

1922 births
1991 deaths
Uruguayan male swimmers
Olympic swimmers of Uruguay
Swimmers at the 1948 Summer Olympics
People from Río Negro Department